Kim Forge (born 4 May 1971 in Crossfield, Alberta, Canada) is an Australian female curler originally from Canada.

Originally from Alberta, Forge went to Australia at early 2000s on a teaching exchange program and never moved back to Canada.

She has been the President of the Australian Curling Federation since 2015 and in 2016 was named to the World Curling Federation Athletes Commission.

As a curler, Forge has represented Australia at four World Mixed Doubles Championships, nine Pacific-Asia Championships and at three World Mixed Curling Championships.

Teams and events

Women's

Mixed

Mixed doubles

Private life
She married with Australian farmer Rod Forge.

References

External links
 
 
 

Living people
Australian female curlers
Australian curling champions
Australian people of Canadian descent
1971 births
People from Rocky View County
Curlers from Alberta
Canadian expatriate sportspeople in Australia